Switzerland sent a delegation to compete at the 1964 Summer Paralympics in Tokyo, Japan.  Its athletes finished fifteenth in the overall medal count.

See also 
 1964 Summer Paralympics medal table
 Switzerland at the 1964 Summer Olympics

References 

Nations at the 1964 Summer Paralympics
1964
Summer Paralympics